Kristian Fardal Opseth (born 6 January 1990) is a Norwegian footballer who  plays as a striker for Sarpsborg 08 in the Eliteserien.

Career
Opseth started his career with Kaupanger before joining Førde.

He joined Sogndal in 2014, and made his debut in a 3–0 defeat against Stabæk.

Opseth later joined Bodø/Glimt. In 2017, he became the all-time top scorer of the Norwegian First Division, having scored 28 goals in 30 matches. Opseth joined Turkish side Erzurumspor on 23 January 2019.

On 31 July 2019, Opseth joined Australian club Adelaide United. In October 2020, it was announced by Bruce Djite that Opseth had left Adelaide United.

On 20 October 2020, Kristian Opseth joined Indian Super League club Bengaluru FC.

On 3 March 2021, he returned to Norway, signing a two-year contract with Sarpsborg 08.

Career statistics

Club

Honours

Club 
Sogndal
 Norwegian First Division: 2015

Bodø/Glimt
 Norwegian First Division: 2017

Adelaide United
 FFA Cup: 2019

Individual 
 Norwegian First Division top scorer: 2017

References 

1990 births
Living people
People from Sogndal
Association football forwards
Norwegian footballers
Sogndal Fotball players
FK Bodø/Glimt players
Erzurumspor footballers
Adelaide United FC players
Bengaluru FC players
Sarpsborg 08 FF players
Norwegian Third Division players
Norwegian Second Division players
Eliteserien players
Norwegian First Division players
Süper Lig players
A-League Men players
Indian Super League players
Norwegian expatriate footballers
Expatriate footballers in Turkey
Expatriate soccer players in Australia
Expatriate footballers in India
Norwegian expatriate sportspeople in Turkey
Norwegian expatriate sportspeople in Australia
Norwegian expatriate sportspeople in India
Sportspeople from Vestland